Ibrahim Moustafa (23 September 1904 – 9 October 1968) was a Greco-Roman wrestler from Egypt. At his first international tournament, the 1924 Olympics, he finished fourth in the light-heavyweight category. Four years later he won the gold medal in this event, becoming the second Egyptian Olympic champion after Sayed Nosseir. Next year, upon invitation from the Swedish Wrestling Federation, Moustafa toured Europe and competed in several international tournaments. A carpenter by profession, upon returning home he became a wrestling coach, and prepared one of his three sons, Adel Ibrahim Moustafa, for the 1948 and 1952 Olympics. After his death, the annual Ibrahim Moustafa International Tournament was carried out in his honor.

References

External links
 
 

1904 births
1968 deaths
Wrestlers at the 1924 Summer Olympics
Wrestlers at the 1928 Summer Olympics
Egyptian male sport wrestlers
Olympic wrestlers of Egypt
Olympic gold medalists for Egypt
Olympic medalists in wrestling
Medalists at the 1928 Summer Olympics
Sportspeople from Alexandria
20th-century Egyptian people